The Cintura Formation is a geologic formation in the northeastern Sonora of Arizona and Mexico. It preserves fossils dating back to the Cretaceous period.

Description

The Cintura Formation is divided into 3 stratigraphic members which represent deltaic depositional elements: the basal Marquechi Member, medial San Marcos Member and the uppermost San Juan Member. The delta is thought to have prograded southward and have an immediate source to its north based on paleocurrents and provenance data.

Fossil content

See also

 List of fossiliferous stratigraphic units in Arizona
 Paleontology in Arizona

References

 

Cretaceous Arizona